Kalai Riadh (born 12 December 1968) is a Tunisian boxer. He competed at the 1992 Summer Olympics and the 1996 Summer Olympics.

References

1968 births
Living people
Tunisian male boxers
Olympic boxers of Tunisia
Boxers at the 1992 Summer Olympics
Boxers at the 1996 Summer Olympics
Place of birth missing (living people)
Bantamweight boxers
20th-century Tunisian people